Blue Ridge Reservoir is located in the Mogollon Rim area of the state of Arizona. Clints Well, Arizona. Blue Ridge Reservoir is one of the more scenic reservoirs in the area, with trees going down to the water line. The facilities are maintained by Coconino National Forest division of the USDA Forest Service.

Fish species
 Rainbow Trout
 Brown Trout
 Green Sunfish

External links

 Arizona Fishing Locations Map
 Arizona Boating Locations Facilities Map
 Video of Blue Ridge Reservoir

References

 

Reservoirs in Coconino County, Arizona
Coconino National Forest
Reservoirs in Arizona